Punia minima is a cicada in the family Cicadidae. It is also known as the pale grass pygmy. It is endemic to Western Australia and the Northern Territory, Australia. In 2012, P. minima was placed in a monotypic genus, Punia; however, in 2020, four new species were described in the genus.

P. minima is a very small cicada with a wingspan of only 10–13 mm.

References

Further reading 

 Owen, Christopher L., et al. "How the aridification of Australia structured the biogeography and influenced the diversification of a large lineage of Australian cicadas." Systematic Biology 66.4 (2017): 569–589.

Cicadas
Endemic fauna of Australia